The women's freestyle 51 kilograms is a competition featured at the 2009 World Wrestling Championships, and was held at the Messecenter Herning exhibition center in Herning, Denmark on September 23.

Medalists

Results
Legend
F — Won by fall

Final

Top half

Bottom half

Repechage

References
Results Book, Page 74

Women's freestyle 51 kg
Olym